Saint-Quentin-la-Tour (Languedocien: Sant Quentin) is a commune in the Ariège department in southwestern France.

Population
Inhabitants of Saint-Quentin-la-Tour are called Saint-Quentinois.

See also
Communes of the Ariège department

References

Communes of Ariège (department)
Ariège communes articles needing translation from French Wikipedia